José Manuel Ayoví Plata (born December 6, 1991) is an Ecuadorian professional footballer who currently plays for China League One club Shijiazhuang Gongfu.

Honours
Cafetaleros de Tapachula
 Ascenso MX: Clausura 2018

References

External links

Living people
1991 births
Ecuadorian footballers
Ecuadorian expatriate footballers
People from Esmeraldas Province
Association football forwards
C.S. Norte América footballers
C.S.D. Independiente del Valle footballers
Barcelona S.C. footballers
Dorados de Sinaloa footballers
Club Tijuana footballers
Cafetaleros de Chiapas footballers
Chiapas F.C. footballers
L.D.U. Quito footballers
Guayaquil City F.C. footballers
Mushuc Runa S.C. footballers
Comunicaciones F.C. players
Ecuadorian Serie A players
Liga MX players
China League One players
Ecuadorian expatriate sportspeople in Mexico
Expatriate footballers in Mexico
Expatriate footballers in Guatemala
Ecuadorian expatriate sportspeople in China
Expatriate footballers in China